Alexey Dmitrievich Galakhov (Алексе́й Дми́триевич Гала́хов; January 13, 1807 in Sapozhok, Ryazan Governorate, Russian Empire – November 16, 1892 in Saint Petersburg, Russian Empire) was a Russian author and literary historian, best known for his Russian Reader for Children (1842), and The History of Russian Literature, Old and New (1863–1875). Galakhov, the Professor at the Saint Petersburg History and Philology Institute, contributed regularly to numerous high profile magazines, most notably, Andrey Krayevsky's Otechestvennye Zapiski where from 1839 till 1856 he published more than 900 articles and reviews, occasionally under the pseudonym Sto Odin (One Hundred and One). He was the author of several novelettes and books of memoirs.

Selected bibliography

Non-fiction
 The Russian Reader for Children (1842)
 The History of the Russian Literature, Old and New (1863–1875)

Fiction
 The Old Mirror (Staroye zerkalo, Старое зеркало, 1845)
 The Error (Oshibka, Ошибка, 1846)
 Puppet Comedy (Kukolnaya komediya, Кукольная комедия, 1847)
 Transformation (Prevrashcheniye, Превращение, 1847)

Memoirs
 From the Notes of One Man (Из записок человека, 1847–1848)
 My Contribution to Magazines (Моё сотрудничество в журналах, 1886)
 The Moscow Literary Coffee-House in 1930s-1840s (Литературная кофейня в Москве в 1830–1840-х гг., 1886)
 The 1840s (Сороковые годы, 1892)

References 

1807 births
1892 deaths
People from Sapozhkovsky District
People from Sapozhkovsky Uyezd
Privy Councillor (Russian Empire)
Russian literary critics